Director general of police (DGP) is a rank in the Indian Police Service, held by the highest ranking police officer in a State or a Union Territory of India, typically heading the state or the UT police force. The DGP is appointed by the cabinet and holds a three-star rank.

There may also be additional officers in the state who hold the rank of DGP. Common appointments for such officers include Director of Vigilance and Anti-Corruption Bureau, Director General of Prisons, Director General of fire forces and civil defence, Criminal Investigation Department (CID), Police Housing Society etc. Additionally officers who hold the rank of DGP may have commensurate appointments in central government organisations such as Director, Central Bureau of Investigation (CBI), Director SVPNPA, DG Central Reserve Police Force (CRPF) etc. The rank insignia of a Director General of Police or Commissioner of Police (in Delhi) is the national emblem over crossed sword and baton. DGP-ranked officers wear Gorget patches on their collar which have a dark blue background with an oak leaf pattern stitched on it, similar to ADGs and IGs.

The Director General of Police of States (State Police Chief) is appointed by the state government in consultation with the UPSC. According to UPSC rules, the state government is required to send the names of five senior IPS officers and after finalizing the three names, the committee will again send the proposal back to the state government and among these three officials, the state government is obliged to nominate the DGP.

List of current Chiefs of Police Forces in the States and Union territories of India

See also 
 Advocate General
 Additional Director General of Police
 Chief Secretary
 Commissioner of Police
 Head of Forest Forces
 Police forces of India
 Law enforcement in India

Notes

References

Rajasthan Police Result 2021

Chiefs of police
Police ranks
Police ranks of India
Three-star officers